Diploschistes muscorum is a species of fungus belonging to the family Graphidaceae.

It has cosmopolitan distribution.

References

Graphidaceae
Taxa named by Giovanni Antonio Scopoli